Volhynia (also spelled Volynia), is a historic region in Central and Eastern Europe, between southeastern Poland, southwestern Belarus, and western Ukraine. The borders of the region are not clearly defined, but the territory that still carries the name is Volyn Oblast, in western Ukraine.
 
Volhynia has changed hands numerous times throughout history and been divided among competing powers. For centuries it was part of the Polish-Lithuanian Commonwealth. After the Russian annexation during the Partitions of Poland, all of Volhynia was made part of the Pale of Settlement on the southwestern border of the Russian Empire. Important cities include Zhytomyr, Rivne, Lutsk, Zviahel, and Volodymyr.

Names and etymology 
;
;
;
;
.

The alternative name for the region is Lodomeria after the city of Volodymyr, which was once a political capital of the medieval Volhynian Principality.

According to some historians, the region is named after a semi-legendary city of Volin or Velin, said to have been located on the Southern Bug River, whose name may come from the Proto-Slavic root  'wet'.

Geography 

Geographically it occupies northern areas of the Volhynian-Podolian Upland and western areas of Polesian Lowland along the Prypyat valley as part of the vast East European Plain, between the Western Bug in the west and upper streams of Uzh and Teteriv rivers. Before the partitions of Poland, the eastern edge stretched a little west along the right-banks of the Sluch River or just east of it. Within the territory of Volhynia is located Little Polisie, a lowland that actually divides the Volhynian-Podolian Upland into separate Volhynian Upland and northern outskirts of Podolian Upland, the so-called Kremenets Hills. Volhynia is located in the basins of the Western Bug and Prypyat, therefore most of its rivers flow either in a northern or a western direction.

Relative to other historical regions, it is northeast of Galicia, east of Lesser Poland and northwest of Podolia. The borders of the region are not clearly defined, and it is often considered to overlap a number of other regions, among which are Polesia and Podlasie.

The territories of historical Volhynia are now part of the Volyn, Rivne and parts of the Zhytomyr, Ternopil and Khmelnytskyi Oblasts of Ukraine, as well as parts of Poland (see Chełm). Major cities include Lutsk, Rivne, Kovel, Volodymyr, Kremenets (Ternopil Oblast) and Starokostiantyniv (Khmelnytskyi Oblast). Before World War II, many Jewish shtetls (small towns), such as Trochenbrod and Lozisht, were an integral part of the region. At one time all of Volhynia was part of the Pale of Settlement designated by Imperial Russia on its southwesternmost border.

History 
The first records can be traced to the Ruthenian chronicles, such as the Primary Chronicle, which mentions tribes of the Dulebes, Buzhans and Volhynians. The land was mentioned in the works of Al-Masudi and Abraham ben Jacob that in ancient times the Walitābā and king Mājik, which some read as Walīnānā and identified with the Volhynians, were "the original, pure-blooded Saqaliba, the most highly honoured" and dominated the rest of the Slavic tribes, but due to "dissent" their "original organization was destroyed" and "the people divided into factions, each of them ruled by their own king", implying existence of a Slavic federation which perished after the attack of the Pannonian Avars.

Volhynia may have been included in (or was in the sphere of influence of) the Grand Duchy of Kyiv (Ruthenia) as early as the tenth century. At that time Princess Olga sent a punitive raid against the Drevlians to avenge the death of her husband Grand Prince Igor (Ingvar Röreksson); she later established pogosts along the Luha River. In the opinion of the Ukrainian historian Yuriy Dyba, the chronicle phrase «и оустави по мьстѣ. погосты и дань. и по лузѣ погосты и дань и ѡброкы» (and established in place pogosts and tribute along Luha), the path of pogosts and tribute reflects the actual route of Olga's raid against the Drevlians further to the west, up to the Western Bug's right tributary Luha River.

As early as 983, Vladimir the Great appointed his son Vsevolod as the ruler of the Volhynian Principality. In 988, he established the city of Volodymer (Володимѣръ).

Volhynia's early history coincides with that of the duchies or principalities of Halych and Volhynia. These two successor states of the Kyivan Rus formed Halych-Volhynia between the 12th and the 14th centuries. 

After the disintegration of the Grand Duchy of Halych-Volhynia circa 1340, the Kingdom of Poland and the Grand Duchy of Lithuania divided the region between them, Poland taking Western Volhynia and Lithuania taking Eastern Volhynia (1352–1366). After 1569, Volhynia was organized as a province of the Polish–Lithuanian Commonwealth. During this period many Poles and Jews settled in the area. The Roman and Greek Catholic churches became established in the province. In 1375, a Roman Catholic Diocese of Lodomeria was established, but it was suppressed in 1425. Many Orthodox churches joined the latter organization in order to benefit from a more attractive legal status. Records of the first agricultural colonies of Mennonites, Protestants from Germany, date from 1783.

After the Third partition of the Polish–Lithuanian Commonwealth in 1795, Volhynia was annexed as the Volhynian Governorate of the Russian Empire. It covered an area of 71,852.7 square kilometres. Following this annexation, the Russian government greatly changed the religious make-up of the area: it forcibly liquidated the Ukrainian Greek Catholic Church, transferring all of its buildings to the ownership and control of the Russian Orthodox Church. Many Roman Catholic church buildings were also given to the Russian Church. The Roman Catholic Diocese of Lutsk was suppressed by order of Empress Catherine II.

In 1897, the population amounted to 2,989,482 people (41.7 per square kilometre). It consisted of 73.7 percent East Slavs (predominantly Ukrainians), 13.2 percent Jews, 6.2 percent Poles, and 5.7 percent Germans. Most of the German settlers had immigrated from Congress Poland. A small number of Czech settlers also had migrated here. Although economically the area was developing rather quickly, upon the eve of the First World War it was still the most rural province in Western Russia.

Ukrainian People's Republic
After the February Revolution and the formation of the Russian Provisional Government, Ukrainian nationalists declared the autonomous Ukrainian People's Republic. The territory of Volhynia was split in half by a frontline just west of the city of Lutsk. Due to an invasion of the Bolsheviks, the government of Ukraine was forced to retreat to Volhynia after the sack of Kyiv. Military aid from the Central Powers as a result of the Treaty of Brest-Litovsk brought peace in the region and some degree of stability. Until the end of the war, the area saw a revival of Ukrainian culture after years of Russian oppression and the denial of Ukrainian traditions. After German troops were withdrawn, the whole region was engulfed by a new wave of military actions by Poles and Russians competing for control of the territory. The Ukrainian People's Army was forced to fight on three fronts: Bolsheviks, Poles and a Volunteer Army of Imperial Russia.

Interwar period

 
In 1921, after the end of the Polish–Soviet War, the treaty known as the Peace of Riga divided the Volhynian Governorate between Poland and the Soviet Union. Poland took the larger part and established Volhynian Voivodeship.

Most of eastern Volhynian Governorate became part of the Ukrainian SSR, eventually being split into smaller districts. During that period, a number of national districts were formed within the Soviet Ukraine as part of cultural liberalization. The policies of Polonization in Poland led to formations of various resistance movements in West Ukraine and West Belarus, including Volhynia. In 1931, the Vatican of the Roman Catholic Church established a Ukrainian Catholic Apostolic Exarchate of Volhynia, Polesia and Pidliashia (Wolhynien, Polissia und Pidliashia in German), where the congregation practiced the Byzantine Rite in Ukrainian language.

From 1935 to 1938, the government of the Soviet Union deported numerous nationals from Volhynia in a population transfer to Siberia and Central Asia, as part of the dekulakization, an effort to suppress peasant farmers in the region. These people included Poles of Eastern Volhynia (see Population transfer in the Soviet Union).

World War II
Following the signing of the Molotov–Ribbentrop Pact in 1939, and the subsequent invasion and division of Polish territories between the Reich and the USSR, the Soviet Union invaded and occupied the Polish part of Volhynia. In the course of the Nazi–Soviet population transfers which followed this (temporary) German-Soviet alliance, most of the ethnic German-minority population of Volhynia were transferred to those Polish areas annexed by Nazi Germany. Following the mass deportations and arrests carried out by the NKVD, and repressive actions against Poles taken by Germany, including deportation to the Reich to forced labour camps, arrests, detention in camps and mass executions, by 1943 ethnic Poles constituted only 10–12% of the entire population of Volhynia.

During the German invasion, around 50,000–100,000 Polish people (mostly women and children) in Volhynia were massacred by the Ukrainian Insurgent Army. The number of Ukrainian victims of Polish retaliatory attacks until the spring of 1945 is estimated at approx. 2,000−3,000 in Volhynia. In 1945, Soviet Ukraine expelled ethnic Germans from Volhynia following the end of the war, claiming that Nazi Germany had used ethnic Germans in eastern Europe as part of an alleged Generalplan Ost. The expulsion of Germans from eastern Europe was part of broader mass population transfers after the war.

The Soviet Union annexed Volhynia to Ukraine after the end of World War II. In 1944, the communists in Volyhnia suppressed the Ukrainian Catholic Apostolic Exarchate. Most of the remaining ethnic Polish population were expelled to Poland in 1945. Since the dissolution of the Soviet Union in the 1990s, Volhynia has been an integral part of Ukraine.

Important relics 
Peresopnytsia Gospel

Famous personalities 
Dov Ber of Mezeritch, rabbi
Hayim Nahman Bialik, literary figure
Shlomo Flam, rabbi
Moisey Kasyanik, weightlifter
Sergei Korolev (1907–1966), Soviet rocket engineer and spacecraft designer.
Malbim, rabbi

See also 
Kingdom of Galicia–Volhynia
Galicia (Eastern Europe)
Massacres of Poles in Volhynia and Eastern Galicia
Historiography of the Volyn tragedy
Polish Autonomous District
Kresy Wschodnie

References

Literature
Andriyashev, Alexander (1887).  &lsqb;Essay on the History of Volyn land&rsqb;  at Runivers.ru in Djvu and PDF formats. Kyiv: Imperial University of Saint Vladimir.

 .
Merten, Ulrich (2015). Voices from the Gulag: Oppression of the German Minority in the Soviet Union. Lincoln, NE: American Historical Society of Germans from Russia. 
Potocki, Jan (1805).   at Polona. Saint Petersburg: Imperial Academy of Sciences.

External links 

American Historical Society of Germans from Russia in Lincoln, Nebraska
GCatholic - Diocese of Lodomeria, Ukraine
GCatholic - Ukrainian Apostolic Exarchate of Volhynia, Polesia and Pidliashia
, from the Roll "Fame" Family Genealogy website
The Journey to Trochenbrod and Lozisht Aug 2006
The Society for German Genealogy in Eastern Europe
The Swiss Mennonite Cultural & Historical Association
Volhynia.com
wolhynien.de 

 
.
Historical regions in Poland
Historical regions in Ukraine
Historical regions in Lithuania
Historical regions